Presidential elections were held in Poland on 8 October 2000. Incumbent President Aleksander Kwaśniewski was easily re-elected in the first round with more than 50% of the vote.

Background
President Kwaśniewski was seen as very likely to win re-election in the run up to the presidential election with polls showing that his popularity was high as 70% support. His main challenger was expected to be Marian Krzaklewski from the Solidarity Electoral Action, which had formed the government since winning the last parliamentary elections in 1997. The other main candidate was a former Foreign Minister and more liberal conservative Andrzej Olechowski, who won support from voters who were discontented with both of the other main candidates and in particular younger voters, businessmen and intellectuals.

Candidates seen as having less of a chance included Andrzej Lepper, a populist farmers leader who opposed entry into the European Union and former president Lech Wałęsa. Wałęsa was rejected as the candidate for the Solidarity party he had won the presidency for, and thus ran separately in the election.

In order to be elected in the first round a candidate had to gain over 50% of the vote. If no candidate reached this level, then a second round would have been held between the top two candidates. As the campaign continued, the biggest question in the election was whether or not incumbent President Kwaśniewski would win the 50% required to avoid a second round.

In the August before the election Kwaśniewski and another former president and candidate Lech Wałęsa were investigated by a court on allegations that they had been informers for the Communist secret police. If they had been found guilty they could have been banned from seeking election to political office for 10 years. However they both claimed that the evidence had been manipulated by political opponents and were cleared by the court.

Solidarity candidate Krzaklewski attacked Kwaśniewski for his past as a Communist party activist. However opinion polls in August showed this had little effect with Kwaśniewski well ahead with over 60% support, while Krzaklewski was second and Olechowski third, but both a long way behind. President Kwaśniewski's campaign focused on reconciling all of Poland with slogans including "Poland, our common home". Most voters felt he had done well as President and he was seen as having done a good job in guiding Poland to membership of NATO. Krzaklewski's popularity was not high due to the infighting in the government led by his Solidarity party since they had won the 1997 parliamentary election. Meanwhile, Lech Wałęsa trailed badly in the polls with only about 2% support, which Wałęsa saw as being due to voters seeing him as being responsible for the pain involved in the transition from communism.

In the election 3 candidates ran on platforms against the European Union. During the campaign one of them, Andrzej Lepper, was arrested for illegally blocking a customs post, however he claimed that this was an attempt to sabotage his campaign.

As the election neared Kwaśniewski dropped in the polls and it became uncertain whether he would win the 50% required to avoid a second round. This followed a television advertisement from Solidarity candidate Krzaklewski in which Kwaśniewski was accused of having mocked Pope John Paul II. The video showed Kwaśniewski apparently urging his security advisor to kiss the ground is a parody of the Pope, although Kwaśniewski claimed this was inaccurate. At least one poll showed Kwaśniewski's support having dropped by 10% in one week following this, however it was the other main candidate, Andrzej Olechowski, who benefited as Krzaklewski was seen as being tarnished for having run a negative campaign.

Candidates
There was no second round since Aleksander Kwaśniewski got over 50% in the first round.

First Round

 Businessman Bogdan Pawłowski (Independent), 55 
 Generał broni Tadeusz Wilecki (National Party), 55

Withdrawn

Results
Incumbent President Kwaśniewski won the election in the first round receiving almost 54% of the vote. Independent Andrzej Olechowski came second beating Solidarity candidate Krzaklewski into third place. Meanwhile, former President Lech Wałęsa only won 1% of the vote and following the election stood down as leader of his small Christian Democratic party.

Notes

References

 
Presidential elections in Poland
Poland
History of Poland (1989–present)
2000 elections in Poland
October 2000 events in Europe

es:Elecciones presidenciales de Polonia de 2010